Rob Elder (born 25 April 1981 in Suva) is an athlete from Fiji.  He competes in archery.

Elder competed at the 2004 Summer Olympics in men's individual archery.  He was defeated in the first round of elimination, placing 48th overall. He also qualified for the 2012 Summer Olympics in the men's individual archery, coming 63 in the ranking round, before almost pulling off a shock comeback over Korean Kim Bub-min (who had earlier won a bronze in the team event). After being 4-0 down, before losing 6–4 in the deciding set in the 1/32 elimination round, needing to shoot 10 for victory, he could only manage a 6.

Achievements in other sports 
In his early years, he was also competing successfully in athletics.

References

External links

 

1981 births
Living people
Olympic archers of Fiji
Archers at the 2004 Summer Olympics
Archers at the 2012 Summer Olympics
Archers at the 2016 Summer Olympics
Fijian male archers
Sportspeople from Suva
Male high jumpers